Abishua ( ʾĂḇīšūaʿ, "my father is rescue") was an early High priest of Israel.
Abishua is mentioned in the books 1 Chronicles (6:35) and Ezra (7:5) as the son of the High Priest Phinehas, son of Eleazar. As such, he is the great-grandson of Aaron, the brother of Moses and first High Priest.  It is likely that Abishua was a contemporary of the Israelite judge Ehud and the Moabite king Eglon.

According to Josephus and other extrabiblical sources, he succeeded his father as High Priest.

Name and namesakes
The meaning of the name "Abishua" is uncertain, but may be "the (divine) father is opulence."
The name also appears in reference to a grandson of Benjamin in 1 Chronicles 8:4.

References

High Priests of Israel